Puissance is a Swedish martial neoclassical music group formed in 1993 consisting of members Henry Möller (who also plays in Arditi) and Frederik Söderlund.

Overview 
Due to their aesthetic approach and past member associations, Puissance are often associated with black metal. However, Puissance do not use guitars but rather electronic instruments such as synthesizers and samplers, resulting in a militant approach somewhere between industrial music and bombastic neoclassical music. Later albums display more of an emphasis on rhythm and a more pop music-based approach.

Nuclear holocaust and misanthropy are commonly explored themes. Lyrics are sung in English although they made some Swedish songs in the beginning of their career on their demo tapes (and most recently, a bonus track on the 2007 album "Grace of God").

Discography

Albums and EPs

External links
 Tartarean Desire Webzine write up of Puissance.

Swedish industrial music groups